The Začarani krug Tour was a tour by Serbian singer Lepa Brena, and was staged in support of her sixteenth studio album, Začarani krug (2011). Comprising 104 shows, the tour visited Europe and North America. It began on October 20, 2011, in Belgrade, Serbia, at the Kombank Arena and concluded on September 29, 2017, in London, England at Troxy.
During the tour she held the biggest concert of her career. The concert in Prilep was attended by more than 200,000 people. It was officially announced in May 2011, with dates for Balkan venues revealed. The tour was also included some festival concerts.

Background
 
On May 4, 2011, Brena announced a concert at the Belgrade Arena for her 51st birthday, October 20, 2011. She revealed that the concert was planned to be held at the Maracana Stadium on June 10, 2011, but because of the fear of rain, she decided for Arena. Due to great interest, she soon added another concert for October 21. At the end of September it is planned to add a third concert, but because of the exhaustion from the concert rehearsal, Brena gave up this idea. On October 24, 2011, she announced a concert in Sofia at Arena Armeec, December 3, 2011. It was her first concert in Bulgaria after 20 years, when she last sang at the Vasil Levski National Stadium in front of more than 110,000 people. At the same time, concerts in Niš, Vienna, as well as concerts for the New Year in Petrovac were announced. At the end of October, dates for North America for the spring of 2012 have been announced. It was Brena's first tour in America after almost ten years. The continuation of the European part of the tour she began in Ljubljana on May 19, where she last performed during the Uđi slobodno Tour. 
Concerts in Novi Bečej, Banja Luka and Berlin were canceled because Brena's activated the thrombus and she ended up at the hospital, followed by a long recovery. The tour continued in December. Začarani krug Tour returned to North America in May 2013. The concert in Novi Sad on February 14, 2014, was announced at the end of 2013. It was Brena's first concert in Novi Sad in 20 years. Due to great interest for the concert in December 2011, Brena announced another concert in Sofia at the Arena Armeec on October 22, 2015. At the end of June 2017, Brena announced a concert in London for September 29 in which she will perform after fifteen years.

Problems with the concert in Timișoara

On March 12, 2012, Lepa Brena announced a concert in Timișoara at the Stadionul Dan Păltinișanu, on June 15, 2012, where she sang in the same place 28 years ago in front of 60,000 people. Lepa Brena was greeted with the highest honor at the border as soon as she reached the soil of Romania. Blinded cars and police security, flowers and honors that fit a world champion are just a detail that illustrates how the Romanians are seeing a star from a neighboring country. Under the special police escort, Brena came to Timișoara where she held a press conference for Romanian media related to the concert that will be held in this city on June 15, 2012. When she arrived in front of the hotel "Timișoara", Brena literally surrounded photographers and journalists from all over Romania. Since she was singing as a girl in Timișoara, for Brena this was a touching encounter with the Romans who followed her career all these years. Atmosphere at the press conference brought our singer, and at one point she sang the song "Ja nemam drugi dom"! Brena told reporters: "I must admit, when I saw flowers at the entrance to Romania, tears began because I remembered in 1984 when I was last here. I just returned all my memories."
However, on June 13, 2012, was announced that the concert is scheduled for June 29, 2012 for technical reasons. The concert organizer told local media that they were forced to cancel the concert because of the rain that had fallen in the past days. "It was not possible to place an extremely demanding stage design and scenography, which will cause the Serbian folk star to appear in a delayed term, in two weeks, in front of the Romanian audience." One of the organizers of this spectacle, Aleksandar Tamaš, pointed out that 70% of tickets were sold and that the purchased tickets will be valid for the new term. On June 26, 2012, the newspaper posted that the announced Lepa Brena concert in Timișoara on June 29, 2012, was canceled. This time the reason for the postponement of the concert is not of a technical nature, but the stadium from 25 to 29 June is reserved for football matches, and because of that, it is not possible to keep the stage and hold the concert. After a few days, Lepa Brena said that she was very disappointed and would gladly schedule a new concert, but when she found a new and serious organizer for the concert.

Set list 
This setlist was obtained from the concert of October 20, 2011 held at Belgrade Arena in Belgrade. It does not represent all shows throughout the tour.

 "Video Introduction" 
 "Uradi to"
 "Metak sa posvetom"
 "Uđi slobodno"
 "Bato, Bato"
 "Grad"
 "Biseru beli" 
 "Recite mu da ga volim"
 "Sanjam"
 "Robinja"
 "Luda za tobom"
 "Ti si moj greh"
 "Čik pogodi"
 "Šeik"
 "Udri Mujo"
 "Igraj Boro moje oro" 
 "Jugoslovenka" 
 "Ja nemam drugi dom"
 "Okrećeš mi leđa" 
 "Golube" 
 "Evo, zima će"
 "Pazi kome zavidiš"
 "Briši me" 
 "Noćas mi srce pati"
 "Biber" 
 "Čačak, Čačak"
 "Mile voli disko"
 "Janoš"
 "Duge noge"
 "Sitnije, Cile, sitnije"
 "Dama iz Londona"
 "Miki Mićo"
 "Hajde da se volimo"
 "Nežna žena"
 "Poželi sreću drugima"
 "Mače moje"
 "Perice, moja merice"
 "Pariski lokal"
 "Stakleno zvono"

Shows

Cancelled shows

References

Lepa Brena concert tours
2011 concert tours
2012 concert tours
2013 concert tours
2014 concert tours
2015 concert tours
2016 concert tours
2017 concert tours